Marion Bailey (born 5 May 1951) is an English actress. She is best known for her work with her partner, filmmaker Mike Leigh, including the films Meantime (1983), All or Nothing (2002), Vera Drake (2004), Mr. Turner (2014), for which she was nominated Supporting Actress of the Year by the London Film Critics' Circle, and Peterloo (2018). In 2019 and 2020, she portrayed Queen Elizabeth The Queen Mother in the third and fourth seasons of The Crown on Netflix, for which she won a Screen Actors Guild award winner for best ensemble in 2020 and 2021.

Personal life
Bailey was born in Bushey Hospital, in Bushey, Hertfordshire, to Rose (née Timberlake) and William Bailey. She grew up in Harrow, Middlesex, and attended Pinner County Grammar School. She was a member of the National Youth Theatre of Great Britain and trained at the Guildhall School of Music and Drama. With writer Terry Johnson, she has a daughter, actress Alice Bailey Johnson.

Film career
As well as Leigh's films, Bailey has appeared as Mrs Peach in Debbie Isitt's Nasty Neighbours (2000), Mary in the Craig Ferguson film I'll Be There and Mrs Adams in S.J.Clarkson's "Toast" (2010). Bailey starred as Mrs Booth in Mr. Turner (2014) and appeared in The Lady in the Van (2015), Allied (2016), Dead in a Week or Your Money Back (2018), Lady Conyngham in Leigh's Peterloo (2018) and played Dinah in Stephen Cookson's "Brighton"(2019).

Television career
Bailey's television work includes Inspector Morse, Casualty, The Bill, Holby City, Midsomer Murders, Agatha Christie's Poirot, A Touch of Frost, Dalziel and Pascoe, Big Deal, Boon, The Bretts, The Ruth Rendell Mysteries, No More Dying Then, Stay Lucky, Heat of the Sun, Micawber, New Tricks, Monday Monday, Being Human and Case Histories. In 1995, she had a recurring role as Avis in the long-running ITV series Shine on Harvey Moon. She also played leading roles in several popular 1980s TV series, including To Have and to Hold, Jury and Charlie.

In 2000, she played Wendy in Carlton's comedy-drama series The Thing About Vince. She has also appeared in many single TV dramas and films including Woyzeck, Way Upstream, Zackharov, Raspberry, Coppers, Derailed, Toast and Jane Austen's Persuasion. She played Jill in the BBC Three comedy series Him and Her, Sue in The Trials of Jimmy Rose, Ingrid in Temple, Cara in Britannia for Sky. She played Queen Elizabeth The Queen Mother in seasons 3 and 4 of international Netflix series The Crown, for which she was the recipient of a Screen Actors Guild Award for Outstanding Performance by an Ensemble in a Television Drama Series.
She has most recently appeared in Shakespeare and Hathaway and Endeavour.

Theatre career
Bailey has worked extensively in British theatre, including at the Chichester and the Hampstead Theatre, and at the Bristol Old Vic, the West Yorkshire Playhouse, London's West End, the Royal Court, the National Theatre, the Old Vic, the Arts Theatre and the Tricycle Theatre. In 1981 she performed in Mike Leigh's West End theatre play Goosepimples, for which she received a Plays and Players Award nomination as Most Promising Newcomer. In 2007, with the Shared Experience company she received a TMA nomination as Best Supporting Performance for her role in Kindertransport.

Bailey appeared in Mike Leigh's Grief at the National Theatre (2011/12). In 2013 she played the Queen in Handbagged at the Tricycle Theatre and in the production's subsequent West End transfer to the Vaudeville Theatre. She returned to the National Theatre to appear in Carrie Cracknell's productions Blurred Lines (2015) and The Deep Blue Sea (2016).

References

External links

1951 births
Living people
English television actresses
English film actresses
Actresses from Hertfordshire
Actors from Watford
20th-century English actresses
21st-century English actresses
Alumni of the Guildhall School of Music and Drama
National Youth Theatre members